Temple of Israel may refer to the following synagogues:
 Temple of Israel (Amsterdam, New York)
 Temple of Israel Synagogue (Rockaway Beach, New York)
 Temple of Israel (Wilmington, North Carolina)

See also
Temple Israel (disambiguation)